British Rail Warship Class may refer to:

 British Rail Class D20/2
 British Rail Class 42
 British Rail Class 43 (Warship Class)
 British Rail Class 22 (Baby Warship)